The 1975 Pacific Southwest Open was a men's tennis tournament played on indoor carpet courts at the UCLA Pauley Pavilion in Los Angeles, California in the United States. The tournament was classified as Grade AA and was part of the Grand Prix tennis circuit. It was the 49th edition of the tournament and ran from September 15 through September 21, 1975. First-seeded Arthur Ashe won the singles title and the $16,000 first place prize money.

Finals

Singles
 Arthur Ashe defeated  Roscoe Tanner 3–6, 7–5, 6–3

Doubles
 Anand Amritraj /  Vijay Amritraj defeated  Cliff Drysdale /  Marty Riessen 7–6(7–3), 4–6, 6–4

References

Los Angeles Open (tennis)
Pacific Southwest Open
Pacific Southwest Open
Pacific Southwest Open
Pacific Southwest Open